Vanna Felicia Rosenberg Synnerholm (born 3 April 1973 in Farsta, Stockholm Municipality) is a Swedish singer and actor. She is married to the film producer Ulf Synnerholm.

Career
Rosenberg started doing plays as a kindergarten-child; her mother, Annika Isaksson, was a drama-pedagogist and the whole kindergarten acted in the 1981 TV program Du måste förstå att jag älskar Fantomen.

As a singer, Rosenberg has been a member of the dance-music group Adastra.

From 1997 to 2001 Rosenberg studied at the Swedish National Academy of Mime and Acting. In 2001 she received a Guldmasken for her appearance in the farce Maken till fruar.

In 2009 and 2010, Rosenberg and her father, Göran Rosenberg, competed in the TV program På spåret.

Selected filmography
1991 – Agnes Cecilia – en sällsam historia
1994 – Rapport till himlen (TV)
1995 – En på miljonen
1996 – Att stjäla en tjuv
1996 – Silvermannen (TV)
1996 – Percy tårar (TV)
1997 – Adam & Eva
1999 – Dödlig drift
2001 – Björnes magasin (TV program)
2003 – Kvarteret Skatan (TV)
2003/2004 – Jullovsmorgon från TV-skeppet (TV program (Jullovsmorgon), together with Peter Harryson)
2004 – Allt och lite till (TV)
2004 – Mongolpiparen
2006 – Tjocktjuven
2007 – En riktig jul (TV ("Julkalendern"))
2010 – Bröderna Karlsson
2010 – Hotell Gyllene Knorren (TV ("Julkalendern"))
2011 – Hur många lingon finns det i världen?
2012 – Kvarteret Skatan reser till Laholm

References

External links

Vanna Rosenberg on Swedish Film Database

1973 births
Living people
Actresses from Stockholm
Singers from Stockholm
Swedish actresses
Swedish people of Polish-Jewish descent
21st-century Swedish singers
21st-century Swedish women singers